Monteco Turner (born September 16, 1978), known mononymously as Monteco, is an American contemporary R&B singer who was active in the mid 1990s. His first single "Is It Me?" was released in 1995, and features fellow contemporary R&B group IMx (then known as Immature). The song peaked at #32 on the Billboard R&B chart, but Monteco's album to promote the single, Soulschool, failed to chart. Monteco released his eponymous second album independently in 1997; it also failed to chart.

Discography

Albums

Singles

References

External links
 
 

1978 births
Living people
American contemporary R&B singers
MCA Records artists
Singers from Mississippi
21st-century American singers